The Respectable Ladies of Pardubice is a 1944 Czech historical comedy film directed by Martin Frič.

Cast
 František Smolík as Jirí, hangman
 Jiřina Štěpničková as Rozina, Jirí's wife
 Eman Fiala as Adam, groom of hangman
 Ferenc Futurista as Groom of hangman
 Terezie Brzková as Countess
 Marta Fricová as Aninka Drazická, Foster-child
 Zita Kabátová as Helena of Alcantar, adventuress
 Jindřich Plachta as Pálka, reeve
 Jaroslav Marvan as Purknistr
 Gustav Nezval as Prokop Trubka, scribe
 František Filipovský as Flaska, gingerbreadman
 Jára Kohout as Hypolit Kostík
 Meda Valentová as Kostík's wife
 Vilém Pfeiffer as Count Borita of Klokocin

References

External links
 

1944 films
1940s historical comedy films
Czech historical comedy films
1940s Czech-language films
Czechoslovak black-and-white films
Films directed by Martin Frič
1944 comedy films
1940s Czech films